María Isabel García Suárez (born 26 March 1978) is a Spanish sprint canoer who competed in the early to mid-2000s. She won seven medals at the ICF Canoe Sprint World Championships with three silvers (K-4 200 m: 2001, 2002, 2003) and four bronzes (K-4 200 m: 2005, K-4 500 m: 2001, 2002, 2003).

García also competed in two Summer Olympics, earning her best finish of fifth in the K-4 500 m event at Athens in 2004.

References

External links
 
 
 

1978 births
Living people
Spanish female canoeists
Olympic canoeists of Spain
Canoeists at the 2000 Summer Olympics
Canoeists at the 2004 Summer Olympics
ICF Canoe Sprint World Championships medalists in kayak
21st-century Spanish women